The Fly River rainbowfish (Melanotaenia sexlineata) is a species of rainbowfish in the subfamily Melanotaeniinae family. It is endemic to the Upper Fly River in Papua New Guinea.

References

Melanotaenia
Taxonomy articles created by Polbot
Fish described in 1964